Doña Bárbara is a 1943 Mexican romantic drama film directed by Fernando de Fuentes and starring María Félix and Julián Soler.  The film is based on the 1929 novel Doña Bárbara by Venezuelan author Rómulo Gallegos, who also co-wrote the screenplay.

Plot
Bárbara is an attractive woman raised mostly on the rivers of Venezuela by her riverboat captain father. Her mother was an Indian woman who died while giving birth to her. She was madly in love with young Asdrúbal until tragedy smashed everything. Some of the men who worked for her father stole their boat and killed her father. The bandits then raped her and shot her boyfriend. This caused her to hate men, but at the same time sleeps with them to get what she wants. She becomes involved with Lorenzo Barquero, the owner of a cattle ranch, with whom she becomes pregnant and has a daughter named Marisela. Barbara later steals Lorenzo's home and fortune and kicks both him and their daughter out, leaving them to fend for themselves with absolutely nothing. Santos is the only remaining son of the Luzardo family, who had a feud with the Barqueros. He returns to his hacienda, Altamira, planning to sell it. Undeterred, Santos sets out to save his cousin Lorenzo and to educate young Marisela. After Barbara sees one of her old rapists and kills him she decides that in order to gain back the peace and happiness that was stolen from her that horrible night she must find and kill all five of her rapists.

Doña Bárbara has a teenage daughter with Lorenzo Barquero, a former land baron that Doña Bárbara left broken and penniless. He is now an alcoholic. The girl, Marisela, is left to fend for herself, and Doña Bárbara has no interest in her, though Juan Primito, a servant of Doña Bárbara's secretly looks after her. Eventually, Marisela is discovered by Santos, who takes her and her father in, and gives the girl education.

Meanwhile, Doña Bárbara has become attracted to Santos, but when she finds that her own daughter is a rival for his affections, Doña Bárbara still looks for ways to ruin Santos.

Cast
 María Félix as Doña Bárbara
 Julián Soler as Santos Luzardo
 María Elena Marqués as Marisela Barquero
 Andrés Soler as Lorenzo Barquero
 Charles Rooner as Don Guillermo
 Agustín Isunza as Juan Primito
 Miguel Inclán as Melquiades
 Eduardo Arozamena as Melesio Sandoval
 Antonio R. Frausto as Antonio Sandoval
 Pedro Galindo as Nieves
 Paco Astol as Mujiquita
 Arturo Soto Rangel as Coronel Pernalete
 Manuel Dondé as Carmelito López
 Felipe Montoya as Balbino Paiba
 Luis Jiménez Morán as Pajarote
 Alfonso Bedoya as Peasant

Other versions
Doña Bárbara has also been adapted into a 1975 Venezuelan telenovela, Doña Bárbara, as well as a 1998 Argentine film directed by Betty Kaplan.

Reference

External links
 
 

1943 films
1940s romance films
Films based on Venezuelan novels
Films directed by Miguel M. Delgado
María Félix
Mexican black-and-white films
1940s Spanish-language films